Tritonoharpa antiquata is a species of sea snail, a marine gastropod mollusk in the family Cancellariidae, the nutmeg snails.

References

 Hemmen J. (2007). Recent Cancellariidae. Wiesbaden, 428pp

Cancellariidae
Gastropods described in 1844